A list of the most notable films produced in Bulgaria in 1910-1949 ordered by year and decade of release. For an alphabetical list of articles on Bulgarian films see .

1910s

1920s

1930s

1940s

References

 
 The Internet movie database

1919-1949
Films
Films
Films
Films
Lists of 1910s films
Lists of 1920s films
Lists of 1930s films
Lists of 1940s films